Area 407 (originally titled Tape 407: The Mesa Reserve) is a 2012 American found footage science fiction horror dinosaur film directed by Dale Fabrigar and Everette Wallin, starring Samantha Lester, James Lyons, Melanie Lyons and Abigail Schrader.

Cast
 Samantha Lester as Jessie
 James Lyons as Jimmy
 Melanie Lyons as Laura Hawkins
 Abigail Schrader as Trish
 Samantha Sloyan as Lois
 Brendan Patrick Connor as Charlie
 Ken Garcia as Charlie

Release
The film was released to Video on Demand on 27 April 2012.

Reception
William Goss of Film.com gave the film a rating of "D" and wrote "For some reason, the motivation of panic seems like a consistent rationale for ensemble hysteria in low-budget films like these, and I’d be able to forgive it all -- well, most of it -- if Area 407 had actually made with some effective frights or a more inventive mythology rather than amateurishly cashing in on this trend of handheld hokum." Jinx of Dread Central gave the film a rating of 1.5 out of 5 and wrote, "As a traditionally shot narrative feature, this movie would’ve been terrible. As a found footage flick? It’s punishment."

The film received a positive review in HorrorNews.net.

References

External links
 
 

American science fiction horror films
2010s science fiction horror films
Found footage films
2010s American films
2012 films